Alma Agger is a Danish singer. She is the winner of the thirteen season of the Danish version of the X Factor.

Performances during X Factor

Discography

Singles
 "The Last Dance" (2020)
 "Om Lidt Er Jeg På Vej" (2020)
 "Hver For Sig" (2020)
 "Uundgåelig" (2021)

EPs
 "Alma Agger" (2021)

References

External links 
 

21st-century Danish women singers
Living people
1999 births